John Robert Cartwright  (March 23, 1895 – November 24, 1979) was the 12th Chief Justice of Canada.

Born in Toronto, Cartwright was the son of James Strachan Cartwright and Jane Elizabeth Young. After graduating from Upper Canada College in 1912, he enrolled at Osgoode Hall Law School and began his articles with Smith, Rae & Greer.

He interrupted his studies in 1914 to serve overseas with the armed forces during the First World War. In 1915 he was wounded twice and for the following two years was an aide-de-camp to three successive generals. He was awarded the Military Cross in 1917.

Upon his return to Canada, he resumed his study of law. He was called to the bar in 1920, then joined the firm of Smith, Rae & Greer in Toronto.

In 1947 he was counsel for the Government of Canada in the prosecutions that resulted from the findings of the Royal Commission on Spying Activities in Canada, which had been chaired by justices Robert Taschereau and Roy Kellock.

He was appointed to the Supreme Court of Canada on December 22, 1949 and became its chief justice on September 1, 1967. He served on the Supreme Court for 20 years and retired on March 23, 1970. The following year, he accepted a position with the law firm Gowling and Henderson as counsel.

Honours

 1917 – awarded the Military Cross.
 1918 – awarded the 1914–15 Star
 1919 – awarded the British War Medal.
 1919 – awarded the WWI Victory Medal.
 1967 – sworn as a member of the Queen's Privy Council for Canada, Honorific The Right Honourable and Post Nominal Letters "PC".
 1967 – awarded the Canadian Centennial Medal.
 1969 – awarded an honorary Doctor of Laws from York University.
 1970 – made a Companion of the Order of Canada (CC).  
 1977 – awarded the Canadian Version of the Queen Elizabeth II Silver Jubilee Medal.

References

External links
 Supreme Court of Canada biography

1895 births
1979 deaths
Canadian military personnel of World War I
Canadian Anglicans
Chief justices of Canada
Justices of the Supreme Court of Canada
Lawyers in Ontario
Companions of the Order of Canada
Osgoode Hall Law School alumni
Military personnel from Toronto
Canadian recipients of the Military Cross
Upper Canada College alumni